The 1913 Miami Redskins football team was an American football team that represented Miami Universityas a member of the Ohio Athletic Conference (OAC) during the 1913 college football season. Led by coach James C. Donnelly in his second year, Miami compiled a 6–2 record.  Donnelly was acting professor of physical education at the school.

Schedule

References

Miami
Miami RedHawks football seasons
Miami Redskins football